September 4 - Eastern Orthodox liturgical calendar - September 6

All fixed commemorations below celebrated on September 18 by Orthodox Churches on the Old Calendar.

For September 5th, Orthodox Churches on the Old Calendar commemorate the Saints listed on August 23.

Saints
 Holy Prophet Zachariah and Righteous Elizabeth, parents of St. John the Forerunner (1st century)  (see also: June 24)
 Martyrs Thathuil (Thiphael) and his sister Bebaia (Thivea) of Edessa (98-138)  (see also: September 4; January 29)
 Martyr Sarbelus of Edessa (98-138) 
 Virgin-martyr Rhais of Alexandria (Iraida, Raissa, Rose) (c. 308)  (see also: September 23)
 Martyrs Juventinus and Maximinus, soldiers, at Antioch (361-363)  (see also: October 9, October 12)
 Martyrs Urban, Theodore, Medimnus and 77 Priests and Deacons, at Nicomedia, under Valens (370)
 Hieromartyr Abdas (Abdias, Obadiah), Bishop of Hormidz-Ardashir, Persia, and Martyrs Hormizd and Sunin (c. 420)  (see also: March 31; May 16)

Pre-Schism Western saints
 Saint Herculanus, a martyr in Porto near Rome, probably under Marcus Aurelius (c. 180)
 Saints Quintius, Arcontius and Donatus, martyrs venerated in Capua and elsewhere in the south of Italy. 
 Saint Obdulia, a holy virgin venerated in Toledo in Spain.
 Saint Genebald of Laon, Bishop of Laon in France and a relative of St Remigius (c. 555)
 Saint Victorinus, Bishop of Como in Italy and an ardent opponent of Arianism (644)
 Saint Bertin, Abbot of Sithin (afterwards called Abbey of Saint Bertin) (c. 709)

Post-Schism Orthodox saints
 Martyrdom of the Holy passion-bearer Gleb of Russia, in holy baptism David (1015)
 Martyrdom of Venerable Athanasius of Brest-Litovsk, Abbot, of Brest-Litovsk, by the Latins (1648)

New martyrs and confessors
 New Hieromartyr Alexis (Belkovsky), Archbishop of Great Ustiug (1937)  (see also: December 2)
 Martyr Euthymius Kochev (1937)
 New Martyrs of the Czech-Slovak Church (1942):
 New Hieromartyrs Vladimír Petřek (cs) and Václav Čikl (cs), priests; 
 New Martyrs Ján Sonnevend (cs), Václav Ornest (cs), and Karel Louda, and their families.

Other commemorations
 Appearance of Apostle Peter to Emperor Justinian at Athyra (Thrace), near Constantinople (6th century)
 Orsha icon of the Theotokos (1631)  (see also: July 20)
 Uncovering of the relics (2001) of Archimandrite Alexander Urodov (1961)
 Repose of Priest Hilarion Felea of Romania (1961)

Icon gallery

Notes

References

Sources
 September 5/September 18. Orthodox Calendar (PRAVOSLAVIE.RU).
 September 18 / September 5. HOLY TRINITY RUSSIAN ORTHODOX CHURCH (A parish of the Patriarchate of Moscow).
 September 5. OCA - The Lives of the Saints.
 The Autonomous Orthodox Metropolia of Western Europe and the Americas (ROCOR). St. Hilarion Calendar of Saints for the year of our Lord 2004. St. Hilarion Press (Austin, TX). p. 66.
 The Fifth Day of the Month of September. Orthodoxy in China.
 September 5. Latin Saints of the Orthodox Patriarchate of Rome.
 The Roman Martyrology. Transl. by the Archbishop of Baltimore. Last Edition, According to the Copy Printed at Rome in 1914. Revised Edition, with the Imprimatur of His Eminence Cardinal Gibbons. Baltimore: John Murphy Company, 1916. pp. 272–273.
 Rev. Richard Stanton. A Menology of England and Wales, or, Brief Memorials of the Ancient British and English Saints Arranged According to the Calendar, Together with the Martyrs of the 16th and 17th Centuries. London: Burns & Oates, 1892. p. 436.

 Greek Sources
 Great Synaxaristes:  5 ΣΕΠΤΕΜΒΡΙΟΥ. ΜΕΓΑΣ ΣΥΝΑΞΑΡΙΣΤΗΣ.
  Συναξαριστής. 5 Σεπτεμβρίου. ECCLESIA.GR. (H ΕΚΚΛΗΣΙΑ ΤΗΣ ΕΛΛΑΔΟΣ).
  05/09/. Ορθόδοξος Συναξαριστής.

 Russian Sources
  18 сентября (5 сентября). Православная Энциклопедия под редакцией Патриарха Московского и всея Руси Кирилла (электронная версия). (Orthodox Encyclopedia - Pravenc.ru).
  5 сентября по старому стилю / 18 сентября по новому стилю. Русская Православная Церковь - Православный церковный календарь на  год.

September in the Eastern Orthodox calendar